Bélabo is a town and commune in Cameroon, lying on the Yaoundé – N'Gaoundéré railway line.  Near the town lies the Sanaga-Yong chimpanzee rescue centre.

Transport 
The town has a railway station served by Camrail, and lies on the Sanaga River.

Factory 
The town has a quarry supplying ballast and aggregate for a factory making concrete sleepers.

Statistics 
 Population = 22,553

See also 
 Railway stations in Cameroon

References 

Populated places in East Region (Cameroon)
Communes of Cameroon